The Sobreiro Monumental (Monumental Cork Oak), also known has The Whistler Tree, is a 236 year old cork oak from Águas de Moura, Palmela, Portugal. It was voted European Tree of the Year in 2018, it has been classified as "Tree of Public Interest" since 1988 and is registered in the Guinness Book of Records as "the largest cork oak in the world".

The name 'Whistler Tree' comes from the whistling sound of the birds that land on its branches.

The tree was almost taken down with other 411 cork oaks in 2000, as an illegal urban expansion took place. By 2001 the law was reformed to better protect the oaks.

See also
 List of individual trees

References

External links 

Individual oak trees
Individual trees in Portugal